Laconia High School (LHS) is a public high school in Laconia, New Hampshire, United States, serving grades 9 through 12.  Enrollment in the 2014-15 school year was 626 students. The school's athletic teams are the Sachems.

The J. Oliva Huot Technical Center, named for Joseph Oliva Huot, is located on the campus.

History 
Laconia High first opened in the fall of 1875 at its original campus on Academy Street, in the South End neighborhood of Laconia.  In 1878, the first class graduated with nine students. In 1923, the school moved to its current campus on Union Avenue to accommodate the increased enrollment. In 1936, a separate practical arts wing was added to the Union Avenue campus. Later additions include the J. Oliva Huot Technical Center wing in 1976 and subsequent renovations in 1983. From 2012-2013 Laconia High School underwent a major renovation and expansion to include a new Technical Center wing and moving the football field farther behind the school.

Academics 
LHS is accredited by the New England Association of Schools and Colleges. To graduate, students must earn a minimum of 26 credits. The 26 credits must include all of the following: English, 4 credits; math, 3; social studies, 3; science, 3; physical education/health, 2; technology, 1; fine arts, 1; and 9 credits of general electives. Due to schedule changes, members of the Class of 2010 must earn a minimum of 22 credits and members of the Class of 2011 must earn a minimum of 24 credits. A student receives one credit per one class per one semester. Students in grades 9-11 must take a full course load each semester, but seniors can reduce the course load as a senior privilege.

Grades are based on a scale of 0-100. The school ranks students based upon their weighted GPA. Classes are weighted with the following multipliers: AP, 5.0; Honors, 4.5; CCR (College and Career Ready), 4.0; Foundations, 4.0.

Clubs, organizations, and activities 
Laconia has over 20 clubs, organizations, and activities. These allow students to get involved in their school community. Some of the more prominent clubs include; Student Council, Key Club, Drama, Band, Color Guard, Math Team, FBLA, Junior Achievement, and Yearbook.

Clubs often hold many events and fundraisers throughout the year, including the following;

Key Club: Mr. LHS
Student Council: Homecoming, Talent Show, Winter Carnival, Semi Formal
Drama Club: performances in the fall, winter, and a spring musical

Athletics 
Sports were first introduced at Laconia in 1923 with the move to Union Avenue. With the  campus and the new building equipped with a gymnasium, the school was able to offer football, basketball, and baseball for men during the fall, winter, and spring months, respectively. Later in the 1920s, field hockey was the first sport to be offered to girls.

Currently, there are five varsity sports offered for men, six varsity sports offered for women, and eight coed varsity sports at LHS. As of the 2018-19 school year, Laconia is classified as a Division II program in the New Hampshire Interscholastic Athletic Association, however, in some sports, they petition down and compete in Division III due to low participation.  The following sports are offered:

Laconia has historically been strong at football, winning 10 championships and appearing in the finals 20 times in the last six decades. The Sachems Football team won the NH Division IV finals against Hanover in the fall of 2007, 35-14, to complete their undefeated 11-0 season and their first championship since 1999. Since the fall of 2018, the team plays in division III of the NHIAA.

Notable alumni
 Stephen S. Cushing (Class of 1902), Associate Justice of the Vermont Supreme Court
 Phil Estes (Class of 1976), American football coach
 Penny Pitou (Class of 1956), Olympic silver medalist, 1960 Squaw Valley, Downhill & Giant Slalom
 Paul Rothemund (Class of 1990), 2007 MacArthur Fellow
 Steve Stetson (Class of 1969), college football player and head coach

References

External links
 

Buildings and structures in Laconia, New Hampshire
Schools in Belknap County, New Hampshire
Public high schools in New Hampshire